André Sogliuzzo (born August 10, 1966) is an American voice actor. His voice-work includes several animated series, including American Dad!, Avatar: The Last Airbender, Harvey Beaks, Jackie Chan Adventures and Star Wars: Clone Wars and video games, such as Battlefield 3, Mafia II, Psychonauts, Ratchet: Deadlocked, Scarface: The World Is Yours, Sekiro: Shadows Die Twice, Skylanders and Spyro.

Early life
Sogliuzzo was born in New York City on August 20, 1966.

Filmography

Film

 Bubba Ho-Tep – Narrator (Uncredited)
 Cats & Dogs: The Revenge of Kitty Galore – Snobby K-9
 Gnomes and Trolls: The Secret Chamber – Fassa
 Justice League: Gods and Monsters – Mr. Guerra, Cop
 Lego DC Batman: Family Matters – The Riddler
 Marmaduke – Additional Voices
 Missing Link – New Worlder
 Open Season – Additional Voices
 Open Season 3 – McSquizzy
 Pawn Sacrifice – Henry Kissinger (Uncredited)
 Public Enemies – Movie Theater Announcement (Uncredited)
 Stewie Griffin: The Untold Story – Additional Voices
 The Express: The Ernie Davis Story – John F. Kennedy (Uncredited)
 The Polar Express – Smokey, Steamer
 Tom & Jerry – Jerry Mouse
 Transformers: Revenge of the Fallen – Sideswipe

Television

 American Dad! – Various
 Avatar: The Last Airbender – King Bumi, Hakoda, Dai Li Captain
 Avengers Assemble – Igor Drenkov (Ep. "Dehulked")
 Brandy & Mr. Whiskers – Gaspar Le Gecko
 Bravest Warriors – Chamsy
 Castlevania – Additional Voices
 Celebrity Deathmatch – Various
 Chozen – Additional Voices
 Courage the Cowardly Dog – Additional Voices
 Elena of Avalor – Alkazar, King Verago, Additional Voices
 Eureka! – Link
 Family Guy – Mel Gibson, Additional Voices
 Father of the Pride – Additional Voices (Ep. "And the Revolution Continues")
 Free for All – Sperm, Glug Glug, Kobe
 Frontline – Voice Over (Ep. "Snitch")
 G.I. Joe: Renegades – Major Bludd, Store Manager
 Glenn Martin, DDS – Additional Voices (Ep. "We've Created a Mobster")
 Harvey Beaks – Jean Luc
 Harvey Birdman, Attorney at Law – Dynomutt, Avenger, Co-Worker, Pope
 Invader Zim – Various
 Jackie Chan Adventures – Hsi Wu, Seymore, Dai Gui, Monk
 Justice League – SWAT Officer, Vendor, Gorilla Soldier
 Kung Fu Panda: Legends of Awesomeness – Tai Lung (Ep. "Master and the Panda")
 Last Week Tonight with John Oliver – Voice Over Cast (Ep. "Immigration reform")
 Lastman – Additional Voices (Ep. "T'es Choupi Aldana")
 Little Ellen – Mr. Macaw (Ep. "Fine and Feathered Friends")
 Love, Death & Robots – Pearly (Ep. "The Dump")
 No Activity – Additional Voices (Ep. "40 Days & 40 Nights")
 Phineas and Ferb – Additional Voices (Ep. "Phineas and Ferb: Star Wars")
 Random! Cartoons – Yaki, Announcer (Ep. "Yaki & Yumi")
 Rocket Power – Buick, Riptide, Old Lifeguard #2 (Ep. "To Be, Otto Not to Be/Reggie/Regina")
 Samurai Jack – Stitches, Taxi Driver (Ep. "Episode XII – Jack and the Gangsters")
 Star Wars: Clone Wars – Captain Typho, Captain Fordo, Commander Cody
 Star Wars Rebels – Captain Slavin
 Starship Regulars – Kaligian Man
 Stuart Little – Monty
 The Adventures of Puss in Boots – Trolbard, Thieves
 The Batman – Duncan (Ep. "The Butler Did It")
 The Cleveland Show – Robert Redford, Teacher (Ep. "Birth of a Salesman")
 The Mighty Ones – Ant #39, Ant #93, Ant #145 (Ep. "The Queen/A Mighty Arm")
 The Owl House – Piniet, Reviewnicorn, Garlog
 Transformers: Robots in Disguise – Clawtrap
 Unsupervised – Sid
 Whatever Happened to... Robot Jones? – Nuts, Stephen (Ep. "Garage Band/Work")
 What's with Andy? – Additional Voices (Ep. "Un-Masked Marauders")
 Winx Club – King Radius (Nickelodeon version)
 Wolverine and the X-Men – Arclight

Video games

 50 Cent: Bulletproof – Cop
 Age of Empires III – Napoleon
 Agents of Mayhem – Quartermile (Enzo Garibaldi), Mister Tako-san, Scandals Bouncer
 Alpha Protocol – Sean Darcy
 Anki Overdrive – Breach
 Armored Core 4 – Leonhardt, Borisovich, Opposing Squad Leader
 Assassin's Creed II – Doctor, Additional Voices
 Assassin's Creed: Brotherhood – Doctors, Additional Voices
 Assassin's Creed: Revelations – Additional Voices
 Avatar: The Last Airbender – King Bumi, Additional Voices
 Avatar: The Last Airbender – Into the Inferno – Hakoda
 Avatar: The Last Airbender – The Burning Earth – King Bumi, Earth King, Additional Voices
 Back 4 Blood – Jim, Additional Voices
 Batman: Arkham Knight – Firefighter Cannon, Firefighter Leary-Wood, Harley Thugs, Joker Thugs
 Battlefield 3 – Dmitri "Dima" Mayakovsky
 Brave: The Search for Spirit Dancer – Hooded Crow, Eagle Spirit Villager
 Brütal Legend – Ratguts
 Call of Duty – Additional Voices
 Call of Duty: Black Ops 4 – Pvt. Goldberg, Additional Voices (Also United Offensive)
 Captain America: Super Soldier – Arnim Zola
 Cars 2 – Max Schnell
 Clash of the Titans – Draco, Ozal, Fisherman, Spirits 
 Command & Conquer: Renegade – Gunner of the Dead-6
 Company of Heroes – Additional Voices
 Condemned 2: Bloodshot – Ethan Thomas, Masked Man, The Alcohol Demon 
 Crash Nitro Kart – Norm, Zem
 Crash Team Racing Nitro-Fueled – Big Norm, Velo, Zem, Sparx, Additional Voices
 Crysis – Major Strickland
 Darksiders II – Karn, The Mad Smith
 Days Gone – Additional Voices
 Dead Island: Riptide – Dr. Kessler, Various
 Dead Rising 3 – Additional Voices
 Dead to Rights: Retribution – Civilian, Union, Cops, Brawlers
 Destroy All Humans! – President Huffman, Farmer
 Destroy All Humans! Path of the Furon – C. Curt Calvin
 Diablo III – Additional Voices (Also Reaper of Souls)
 Dirge of Cerberus: Final Fantasy VII – Additional Voices
 Dishonored – Aristocrat, Weeper
 Disney Infinity – Additional Voices
 Doom 3 – Additional Voices
 Doom 3: BFG Edition – Additional Voices
 Doom 3: Resurrection of Evil – Additional Voices
 Doom Eternal – The Father
 Dreamfall Chapters – Blind Bob
 Dreamfall: The Longest Journey – Blind Bob
 Eat Lead: the Return of Matt Hazard – Captain Carpenter, Dockworker, Employee Programmer
 Enemy Territory: Quake Wars – Strong Technician
 Enter the Matrix – Additional Voices
 Epic Mickey 2: The Power of Two – Additional Voices
 EverQuest II – Capt. Rockbelly, Sneed Galliway, Wesaelan Brookshadow, Generic Male Wood Elf Merchant, Generic Male Ogre Merchant, Generic Male Gnome Merchant, Generic Male High Elf Merchant, Generic Male Ogre, Generic Zombie Enemy, Generic Troll Enemy, Generic Living Statue Enemy, Generic Troglodyte Enemy, Generic Boarfiend Enemy
 Evil Dead: A Fistful of Boomstick – Additional Voices
 Fantastic Four – Diablo, Additional Voices
 F.E.A.R. – Delta Force, Additional Voices
 Final Fantasy VII Remake – Wymer
 Final Fantasy X – Zuke
 Final Fantasy XIII – Bartholomew Estheim
 Final Fantasy XV – Additional Voices
 Fragments of Him – Harry (Prototype)
 Freedom Fighters – Additional Voices
 Kurokishi no Kamen – Rednech Chief, Electric Guardian
 Ghostbusters: The Video Game – Additional Voices
 Gladius – Urlan
 GoldenEye: Rogue Agent – Additional Voices
 Gothic 3 – Additional Voices
 Grand Theft Auto V – The Local Population
 Grand Theft Auto Online –Juan Strickler (El Rubio)
 Guild Wars 2 – Eltok, Oliver, Ahai Tamini
 Guild Wars: Eye of the North – Gadd, Torg, Egil
 Heroes of the Storm – Zul'jin
 James Bond 007: From Russia with Love – Additional Voices
 James Cameron's Avatar: The Game – Tan Jala, Na'vi, RDA
 Kinect Sports: Season Two – Baseball Umpire
 Kingdom Hearts Birth by Sleep – Deep Space Patrol
 Kingdoms of Amalur: Reckoning – Adessa Citizen, Apule Vire, Borri Kura, Brok Almar, Courdan Passant, Grian Shane, Kester Barclay, Manon Souris, Wyl Rendig, Ysa Citizen
 Kingdom Under Fire: Circle of Doom – Bertrand, Walter
 Knights Contract – Heinrich Hoffmann / Inquisitor
 Kung Fu Panda: Showdown of Legendary Legends – Li, Shen
 Legend of the Guardians: The Owls of Ga'Hoole – Additional Voices
 Lego Dimensions – Lord Garmadon, Munchkin Mayor, Bezar, Vigo, Joker (The Lego Batman Movie)
 Lego Star Wars: The Force Awakens – Mi'no Teest
 Lightning Returns: Final Fantasy XIII – Additional Voices
 Madagascar – Bat, Sailor, Cool Dude, Drunk Bum
 Mafia II – Luca Gurino, Carlo Falcone
 Mafia III – Additional Voices
 Mafia: Definitive Edition – Additional Voices
 Medal of Honor: Pacific Assault – Additional Voices
 Medal of Honor: Rising Sun – Donny Griffin
 Men of Valor – Harlen, Aussie #1
 Metro Exodus – Baron, Radio, Bridge Guard
 Metro: Last Light – Additional Voices
 Minority Report: Everybody Runs – Additional Voices
 MTX Mototrax – Additional Voices
 Need for Speed: Most Wanted – Rog, Narrator
 Night at the Museum: Battle of the Smithsonian – Al Capone, Egyptian Spearman, Ben Franklin
 No One Lives Forever 2: A Spy in H.A.R.M.'s Way – Magnus Armstrong
 Operation Flashpoint: Red River – HQ
 Payday 2 – Scarface
 Pirates: The Legend of Black Kat – Duncan, Marcus Deleon
 Prison Break: The Conspiracy – Additional Voices
 Project: Snowblind – 2nd Lt. Nathan Frost
 Prototype 2 – Additional Voices
 Psychonauts – Fred, Napoleon Bonaparte
 Puss in Boots – Puss in Boots
 Quake 4 – Corporal Alejandro Cortez
 Rage 2 – Ramiro Rapido, River Giant Gunner, Shrouded Assault, Wellspring Goon, Wellspring Hub
 Rango – Wounded Bird, Shooter #2, Jumper #4,
 Ratchet: Deadlocked – Ace Hardlight
 Rise to Honor – Additional Voices
 Saints Row – Stilwater's Residents
 Saints Row 2 – Additional Voices
 Scarface: The World Is Yours – Tony Montana
 Scooby-Doo! and the Spooky Swamp – Emilio Gonzalez
 Secret Weapons Over Normandy – American Voices #3
 Sekiro: Shadows Die Twice – Isshin Ashina
 Shark Tale – Additional Tenant Fish
 Shrek 2 – Puss in Boots, Troll, Treants, Papa Bear, Mr. Hood
 Shrek Forever After – Puss in Boots
 Shrek n' Roll – Puss in Boots, Evil Tree #1
 Shrek Smash n' Crash Racing - Puss in Boots, Lord Farquaad
 Shrek Super Slam – Puss in Boots, Robin Hood
 Shrek the Third – Puss in Boots, Jock Captain, Pirate #1, Evil Trees
 Shrek's Carnival Craze – Puss in Boots
 Singularity – Additional Voices
 Skylanders: Giants – Camo, Voodood
 Skylanders: Imaginators – Camo, Voodood
 Skylanders: Spyro's Adventure – Additional Voices
 Skylanders: SuperChargers – Camo
 Skylanders: Swap Force – Camo, Voodood
 Skylanders: Trap Team – Camo, Voodood
 SOCOM U.S. Navy SEALs: Fireteam Bravo 3 – LONESTAR 
 Spawn: Armageddon – Mammon, Additional Voices
 Spider-Man 3 – Additional Voices
 Spider-Man: Edge of Time – Additional Voices
 Spyro: A Hero's Tail – Sparx the Dragonfly
 Spyro: Enter the Dragonfly – Sparx the Dragonfly, Bartholomew the Yeti, Other Dragonflies, Additional Voices
 Spyro Reignited Trilogy – Sparx the Dragonfly
 Spyro: Year of the Dragon – Sparx the Dragonfly, Bartholomew the Yeti, Additional Voices
 StarCraft II: Wings of Liberty – Additional Voices
 Star Ocean: The Divine Force – Vahnel Thoran, Santa the Mercantilean
 Star Wars: Knights of the Old Republic – Master Dorak, Bounty Hunter
 Star Wars Knights of the Old Republic II: The Sith Lords – Czerka Officer, Czerka Salvage Crew, Mercenaries, Patron, Race Master, Rutum, Salvagers
 Star Wars: Squadrons – TIE Pilot
 Star Wars: The Clone Wars – Cydon Prax, Clone Troopers
 State of Decay 2 – Zombie
 Tactics Ogre: Reborn – Mirdyn Walhorn
 Tak: The Great Juju Challenge – Bartog
 Tales of Symphonia – Forcystus
 Teenage Mutant Ninja Turtles (3DS) – Slash
 Teenage Mutant Ninja Turtles (Mobile) – Leatherhead, Purple Dragons, Bebop
 The Bourne Conspiracy – Additional Voices
 The Darkness II – Frank, Additional Voices
 The Elder Scrolls V: Skyrim – Male Khajiits
 The Elder Scrolls Online – Additional Voices 
 The Hobbit – Bard, Ugslap
 The Legend of Korra – Chi-Blocker #1, Triad #1, Pro-Bender #1
 The Lord of the Rings: The Battle for Middle-earth – Orcs
 The Lord of the Rings: The Battle for Middle-earth II – Gorkil the Goblin King, Orcs 
 The Polar Express – Smokey, Steamer
 The Saboteur – Jules, Luc
 The Scorpion King: Rise of the Akkadian – Desert Hermit, Minoian Soldier, Dice Man #2
 The Secret World – Dave Screed, Sandy "Moose" Jansen, Nicholas Winter, Abdel Daoud, Senator Henry Philips Cicero, Milosh, Irusan, Daimon Kiyota, John, Additional Voices
 The Sopranos: Road to Respect – Anzallata Twins
 Titan Quest – Additional Voices
 Titan Quest: Immortal Throne – Additional Voices
 Transformers: Devastation – Thundercracker, Scavenger, Seeker #2
 True Crime: New York City – Additional Voices
 True Crime: Streets of LA – Additional Voices
 Turning Point: Fall of Liberty – Weinberg
 Unit 13 – Alabama
 Vampire: The Masquerade – Bloodlines – Additional Voices
 Watchmen: The End is Nigh – Additional Voices
 WildStar – Mordesh Male, Falkrin Male, Lopp Male
 Wolfenstein: The New Order – Demonic Voice
 World in Conflict – Additional Voices
 World in Conflict: Soviet Assault – Additional Voices
 World of Warcraft – Allaris Narassin, Arluin, Advisor Vandros, Grumbol Grimhammer
 World of Warcraft: Battle for Azeroth – Grumbol Grimhammer (Uncredited)
 World of Warcraft: Shadowlands – Additional Voices
 Yakuza: Like a Dragon – Additional Voices
 X-Men: Destiny – Colossus, Luis Reyes, Additional Voices
 X-Men Legends – Angel, Morlock Thief, Future Sentinel

Live-action
 Cosmos: A Spacetime Odyssey – Christopher Wren, Weichelberger
 Iron Will – Young Man on Wagon (Uncredited)
 Looking for Richard – Messenger
 Mank – Newsreel Interviewer (Uncredited)
 SpongeBob SquarePants – Stunt Gorilla (Ep. "Born Again Krabs/I Had an Accident")
 You've Got Mail – Waiter at Lalo

Theme parks
 Seven Dwarfs Mine Train – Doc

References

External links
 
 André Sogliuzzo on Twitter

Living people
American male voice actors
American male comedians
American male film actors
American male television actors
American male video game actors
American people of Italian descent
Animal impersonators
20th-century American male actors
20th-century American comedians
21st-century American male actors
Comedians from New York City
Male actors from New York City
1966 births